Bohumil Váňa (17 January 1920 in Prague – 4 November 1989 in Prague) was a male international table tennis player from Czechoslovakia.

Table tennis career
From 1935 to 1955 he won an incredible 30 medals in singles, doubles, and team events in the World Table Tennis Championships. This included 13 gold medals. He also won five English Open titles.

See also
 List of table tennis players
 List of World Table Tennis Championships medalists

References

1920 births
1989 deaths
Czech male table tennis players
Czechoslovak table tennis players
Sportspeople from Prague